Elijah Barrett Prettyman Jr. (June 1, 1925 – November 4, 2016) was an American lawyer.

Early life and education
Prettyman was born in Washington, D.C. His father was United States federal judge E. Barrett Prettyman.

Prettyman graduated from St. Albans School in Washington, D.C. He then served in the United States Army in Europe during World War II. In 1949, he graduated from Yale University. He then worked as a journalist for two years in Rhode Island. In 1953, he received a law degree from the University of Virginia Law School.

Career
Prettyman served as law clerk to  United States Supreme Court justices Robert H. Jackson, Felix Frankfurter, and John Marshall Harlan II. He then practiced law in Washington, D.C. In 1962, he negotiated an agreement with Fidel Castro to secure the release of prisoners involved in the Bay of Pigs invasion. He served as special counsel to the United States House of Representatives Ethics Committee in the 1980s involving the Abscam investigation.

Death
Prettyman died in a hospital in Washington, D.C. from a respiratory ailment. He is buried at Rockville Cemetery in Rockville, Maryland.

See also 
 List of law clerks of the Supreme Court of the United States (Seat 2)
 List of law clerks of the Supreme Court of the United States (Seat 9)

Notes

External links 
 E. Barrett Prettyman papers at the University of Maryland Libraries

1925 births
2016 deaths
Lawyers from Washington, D.C.
Military personnel from Washington, D.C.
St. Albans School (Washington, D.C.) alumni
Yale University alumni
University of Virginia School of Law alumni
Law clerks of the Supreme Court of the United States
Journalists from Rhode Island
20th-century American lawyers
Burials in Maryland